Maria Sødal Arredondo (born 6 July 1985 in Vennesla, Norway) is a Norwegian pop singer. Her surname Arredondo comes from her Chilean stepfather.

Career
In March 2003, Arredondo released her first album, the self-titled  Maria Arredondo by Universal Music Norway. The album was a success in Norway, attaining the highest possible scores from a Norwegian newspaper, VG.

In November 2004, Arredondo released her second album, Not Going Under. This was the first album to have videos for the singles, as Arredondo did not produce any videos for her first album.

Arredondo released a Christmas album, Min Jul with some tracks produced and arranged by Jon Lord of Deep Purple). The track "On Christmas Day" was released as a single. Arredondo's three albums have combined sales of over 150,000.

Arredondo was among the contributors to the song "That Day", along with singers Marit Larsen and Marion Raven, as both members of the pop duo M2M.

On 12 November 2007, she released her fourth album For a Moment. The first single from this album, "Brief and Beautiful" became a major hit throughout the fall. "Brief and Beautiful" was written by Hanne Sørvaag and Harry Sommerdahl, and a Spanish-language adaptation of this song called "Fue para los dos" was released earlier in 2007 by Spanish singer Edurne.

Her fourth album was met with mixed reviews. On the album, "Even when you're with me" is a cover of the Spanish singer Chenoa's "Me Enamoro Del Dolor", and "If You Could Only See Me" was originally recorded by another Norwegian artist called Ina.

Arredondo entered the qualifying rounds of the Melodi Grand Prix 2010 (the Norwegian selection process for the Eurovision Song Contest) on 16 January 2010 and was voted through to the national final, with the song "The Touch", which is written by Rolf Løvland.

Today, Maria works (beside her singing career) 20% in Heggedal church, Asker.

In July 2014, Maria took the leading female role in a musical play titled "Kober Mystery". In November, the planned "Sound Of Music in Concert" was staged for two shows, also starring Maria.

Musical style
Her musical style is a mixture of pop and dream pop very similar to artists such as M2M, Natalie Imbruglia, Michelle Branch, Jewel, and The Cranberries.

Discography

Studio albums

Singles
/ : The singles were only released as radio single.
—: The singles did not enter the charts

Features

References

External links
 UK Fansite
 Chinese Fan-bars (@maria @arredondo @mariaarredondo on Baidu Tie-bar)

1985 births
Living people
Norwegian pop singers
People from Vennesla
Melodi Grand Prix contestants
21st-century Norwegian singers
21st-century Norwegian women singers